Daniel Dunne (8 January 1908 – 22 May 1984) was an Irish hurler. His inter-county career with the Kilkenny senior hurling team lasted from 1931 until 1933.

Honours

Kilkenny
All-Ireland Senior Hurling Championship (2): 1932, 1933
Leinster Senior Hurling Championship (3): 1931, 1932, 1933
National Hurling League (1): 1932-33

References

1908 births
1984 deaths
Young Irelands (Dublin) hurlers
Kilkenny inter-county hurlers
All-Ireland Senior Hurling Championship winners